Paranarsia joannisiella is a species of moth in the family Gelechiidae. It is the only species in the genus Paranarsia. It is found in Spain, France, Switzerland, Austria, Italy and Slovenia.

The wingspan is about 12 mm.

The larvae possibly feed on Poaceae species.

References

Anomologini
Monotypic moth genera
Moths of Europe
Taxa named by Émile Louis Ragonot